Glòria Comerma Broto (born 18 April 1987) is a Spanish field hockey player from Terrassa who plays as an attacker for Spanish club Egara, for which her sister, Anna Comerma, also plays. She has also played 23 times for Spain women's national field hockey team. Along with her hockey career, she is studying marketing at a university. Some of her hobbies are playing padel and tennis.

Background

2003/2004 - Club Egara (JUNIOR)
2005/2006 - Club Egara
2006/2007 - Club Egara

Related links
Interview for Ràdio Municipal de Terrassa (30/01/2007) 
Website with more information

External links
 

1987 births
Living people
Sportspeople from Terrassa
Spanish female field hockey players
Field hockey players from Catalonia
Field hockey players at the 2008 Summer Olympics
Field hockey players at the 2016 Summer Olympics
Olympic field hockey players of Spain